Stéphane Lhomme (born 4 November 1965 in Bordeaux) is a French  activist. He is president of Tchernoblaye association, and was spokeperson of "Sortir du nucléaire" Network from 2002 to 2010.

Stéphane Lhomme was arrested in May 2006 and in April 2008 by French police for allegedly leaking a confidential report saying that the European Pressurized Reactor French nuclear reactor would not resist to an airplane crash.

References

French anti–nuclear power activists
Living people
1965 births